Landis's Missouri Battery, also known as Landis's Company, Missouri Light Artillery, was an artillery battery that served in the Confederate States Army during the early stages of the American Civil War. The battery was formed when Captain John C. Landis recruited men from the Missouri State Guard in late 1861 and early 1862. The battery fielded two 12-pounder Napoleon field guns and two 24-pounder howitzers for much of its existence, and had a highest reported numerical strength of 62 men. After initially serving in the Trans-Mississippi Theater, where it may have fought in the Battle of Pea Ridge, the unit was transferred east of the Mississippi River. The battery saw limited action in 1862 at the Battle of Iuka and at the Second Battle of Corinth.

In 1863, the unit was transferred to Grand Gulf, Mississippi, a key point on the Mississippi River. After Major General Ulysses S. Grant landed Union infantry at Bruinsburg, Landis's Battery formed part of Confederate defenses at the battles of Port Gibson in early May, after which Landis was promoted and Lieutenant John M. Langan took command. Later that month, it took part in the Battle of Champion Hill. On May 17, the battery was part of a Confederate force tasked with holding the crossing of the Big Black River at the Battle of Big Black River Bridge, where it may have suffered the capture of two cannons. Landis's Battery next saw action during the siege of Vicksburg. While there, the battery helped repulse Union assaults on May 22. Landis's Battery was captured when the Confederate garrison of Vicksburg surrendered on July 4. Although the surviving men of the battery were exchanged, the battery was not reorganized after Vicksburg; instead, it was absorbed into Guibor's Missouri Battery along with Wade's Missouri Battery.

Background

In the United States during the early 19th century, a large cultural divide developed between the Northern States and the Southern States over the issue of slavery. By the time of the 1860 United States presidential election, slavery had become one of the defining features of southern culture, with the ideology of states' rights being used to defend the institution. Eventually, many southerners decided that secession was the only way to preserve slavery, especially after abolitionist Abraham Lincoln was elected president in 1860. His candidacy was regionally successful, as much of his support was from the Northern States; he received no electoral votes from the Deep South. Many southerners rejected the legitimacy of Lincoln's election, and promoted secession. On December 20, 1860, the state of South Carolina seceded, and the states of Mississippi, Florida, Alabama, Georgia, Louisiana, and Texas followed suit in early 1861. On February 4, the seceding states formed the Confederate States of America; Jefferson Davis became the nascent state's president.

In Charleston Harbor, South Carolina, the military installation of Fort Sumter was still held by a Union Army garrison. On the morning of April 12, the Confederates fired on Fort Sumter, beginning the American Civil War. The fort surrendered the next day. Shortly after the attack, Lincoln requested that the states remaining in the Union provide 75,000 volunteers; in the coming weeks Virginia, North Carolina, Tennessee, and Arkansas joined the Confederacy. A Union army commanded by Brigadier General Irvin McDowell moved south into Virginia and attacked two Confederate armies commanded by Brigadier Generals P. G. T. Beauregard and Joseph E. Johnston on July 21. In the ensuing First Battle of Bull Run, the Union army was routed.

Meanwhile, the state of Missouri was politically divided. The state legislature voted against secession, but Governor Claiborne F. Jackson supported it. Jackson decided to mobilize the state militia to a point outside of St. Louis, where the St. Louis Arsenal was located. Brigadier General Nathaniel Lyon, the commander of the arsenal, moved to disperse the militiamen on May 10 in the Camp Jackson affair; a pro-secession riot in St. Louis followed. In turn, Jackson created the Missouri State Guard as a new militia organization, appointing Major General Sterling Price as the organization's commander on May 12. After a June 11 meeting between Lyon, Jackson, Price, and United States Representative Francis P. Blair Jr. failed to lead to a peaceable compromise, Lyon moved against the state capital of Jefferson City, ejecting Jackson and the pro-secession elements of the state legislature on June 15.

Two days later, the Missouri State Guard suffered another defeat at the hands of Lyon, this time at the Battle of Boonville, which led Jackson and Price to withdraw to southwestern Missouri. Lyon pursued, although a portion of his command, under Colonel Franz Sigel, was defeated at the Battle of Carthage on July 5. Price was reinforced by Confederate States Army troops commanded by Brigadier General Benjamin McCulloch; the latter commanded the combined force. On August 10, Lyon attacked the Confederate camp near Wilsons Creek. Lyon's plan in the ensuing Battle of Wilson's Creek was a pincer attack, with Lyon leading the main Union body to attack one side of the Confederate camp, and Sigel swinging a column around to attack the Confederate rear. The plan failed as Sigel was routed and Lyon was killed; the Union troops retreated all the way to Rolla after the defeat. Price followed up the Confederate victory at Wilson's Creek by driving north towards the Missouri River. On September 13, the Missouri State Guard encountered Union troops near Lexington; the city was soon placed under siege. The Union garrison surrendered on September 20, ending the siege of Lexington. However, Major General John C. Frémont concentrated Union troops near Tipton, threatening Price's position. In turn, Price withdrew to Neosho in the southwestern part of the state. On November 3, Jackson and the pro-secession elements of the state legislature voted to secede and join the Confederate States of America as a government-in-exile; the anti-secession elements of the legislature had voted against secession in July.

Service history

1862

Captain John C. Landis, formerly an officer in the Missouri State Guard, was authorized in December 1861 to recruit an artillery unit for official service in the Confederate States Army. Landis's recruiting operations were centered near Osceola, Missouri, and the men recruited were former members of the Missouri State Guard. Despite not being able to enlist enough men to bring the battery to full strength, the unit traveled to Des Arc, Arkansas in January 1862 to be equipped with cannons. The battery was assigned two 12-pounder Napoleon field guns and two 24-pounder howitzers; all four cannons were made of brass. The unit joined the Army of the West in March 1862 after the Battle of Pea Ridge; more men joined the unit afterwards. Archaeological evidence suggests at least a portion of the battery may have been engaged at Pea Ridge, as part of a cannonball that could have been fired only from a 24-pounder howitzer was recovered at Pea Ridge National Military Park in 2001. As Landis's Battery was the only Confederate artillery battery armed with 24-pounder howitzers to serve west of the Mississippi River, this would likely indicate that at least a portion of the battery participated in the fighting, likely as part of Brigadier General William Y. Slack's brigade. However, other sources indicate that the battery did not see action in the battle. Around this time, the battery was assigned to Brigadier General Daniel M. Frost's artillery brigade and followed the rest of the Army of the West across the Mississippi River in mid-April.

On May 1, while stationed in the vicinity of Memphis, Tennessee, the battery officially elected its officers. A muster conducted on May5 at Corinth, Mississippi, found 62 men in the battery; it also noted that the battery was armed with four cannons. Union troops had previously occupied positions near the city on May 3, beginning the siege of Corinth. The battery also fought in a skirmish in the vicinity on May 28 before the Confederates abandoned the city on the night of May 29/30. Landis's Battery then spent the next several months stationed at various points in Mississippi. In September 1862, Price, now commanding the Army of the West, was preparing for an offensive designed to support the Confederate Heartland Offensive. On September 14, Price occupied Iuka, Mississippi, as part of his movement; additional Confederate forces under the command of Major General Earl Van Dorn were only a four-days' march away. Major General Ulysses S. Grant, one of the top Union commanders in the region, wanted to avoid the possibility of Price and Van Dorn joining forces. To accomplish this goal, Grant sent troops commanded by Major General E. O. C. Ord to attack Iuka from the north, and others under Major General William Rosecrans to attack the city from the south. During the ensuing Battle of Iuka on September 19, Landis's Battery fought as part of Brigadier General Martin E. Green's brigade, assigned to Brigadier General Lewis Henry Little's division of the Army of the West. Although the battery came under hostile fire at Iuka, it did not fire its cannons. Price was able to fend off Rosecrans, and an acoustic shadow prevented Ord from learning of the fight until after it was over. By September 20, the Army of the West had escaped from Iuka.

Price and Van Dorn then joined forces; Van Dorn commanded the combined army, as he had seniority over Price, who was relegated to corps command. Rosecrans responded to the Confederate consolidation by moving his army to Corinth on October 2. The Union position at Corinth consisted of an exterior line of fortifications built by the Confederates earlier in the war and a new inner line built as the result of orders by Major General Henry Halleck. On October 3, Van Dorn attacked, beginning the Second Battle of Corinth. Landis's Battery was part of Green's brigade of Brigadier General Louis Hébert's division of Price's corps during the battle. During the battle, Landis's Battery continued to operate two 12-pounders and two 24-pounders. On the first day at Corinth, Landis's Battery, as well as Guibor's Missouri Battery, participated in an artillery duel with two Union batteries from the 1st Missouri Light Artillery: Battery I and Battery K. After two more Confederate artillery batteries joined the fighting, the Union artillery was forced to withdraw, allowing the infantry of Green's brigade to attack the Union line. Later that day, while the Confederate infantry was still fighting along the Union main line, Union infantry approached the Confederate flank, and advanced towards Landis's and Guibor's batteries. Artillery fire from the two batteries stopped the progress of the Union advance, and the Union infantry withdrew as darkness began to fall.

The Confederate infantry assaults on October3 had driven Rosecrans's men from the outer line, but the inner line was still in Union hands. That night, Landis's Battery fired at the interior Union lines, as the battery's guns had a longer effective range than most of the other Confederate artillery. Van Dorn then ordered another assault the next day. The October4 fighting briefly carried portions of the inner Union line, but the gains could not be held. The Confederates withdrew from Corinth that night in defeat. Landis's Battery suffered ten casualties at Corinth. The unit formed part of the Confederate rear guard, avoiding capture at the Battle of Davis Bridge. The battery's equipment had been damaged during the Corinth campaign, so the unit was detached to Jackson, Mississippi, for repairs. On November 29, Landis's men rejoined the Army of the West and they spent the rest of 1862 at Grenada, Mississippi.

1863

On January 27, 1863, the battery was transferred to Grand Gulf, Mississippi, joining the defenses on the Big Black River. While stationed at Grand Gulf, the battery participated in several minor engagements with Union gunboats, although some of the artillerymen reported boredom. In mid-March, the battery guarded a point known as Winkler's Bluff on the Big Black River, with orders to allow no boats to pass the point. On April 29, Union Navy vessels commanded by Admiral David Dixon Porter bombarded the Confederate position at Grand Gulf, resulting in the Battle of Grand Gulf, although Landis's Battery was not part of the Confederate front line. One fort held out, so Grant landed 24,000 men downriver at Bruinsburg. These men soon moved east from the river, leading Brigadier General John S. Bowen, the Confederate commander at Grand Gulf, to send a blocking force to Port Gibson in an attempt to stop Grant's incursion. During the morning of May 1, Landis's Battery's two howitzers and their crews were sent to join the blocking force. During the Battle of Port Gibson, the battery fired at men of Major General John McClernand's Union corps and engaged in an artillery duel with the 8th Michigan Light Artillery; the unit suffered three casualties during the fighting and did not disengage until the late afternoon. At one point in the battle, the battery was also subjected to Union sharpshooter fire, before dispersing their attackers with canister. Despite holding initially, Union pressure eventually drove in Bowen's right, causing the Confederates to retreat before Grant outflanked them. After Port Gibson, the Confederates were forced to abandon their position at Grand Gulf on May 3; Landis's Battery again served as part of a rear guard.

Meanwhile, Grant was faced with a choice: he could approach Vicksburg from either the south or the east. An attack from the south presented a more direct path to the city, but an advance from the east presented the better chance of a complete envelopment of Lieutenant General John C. Pemberton's garrison at Vicksburg, so Grant decided on the latter route. On May 12, Union troops brushed aside Confederate resistance at the Battle of Raymond before moving against Jackson, where Confederate General Joseph E. Johnston was positioned with 6,000 men. Grant attacked the city on May 14, and a Union victory in the ensuing Battle of Jackson forced Johnston out of the city, preventing him from reinforcing Pemberton. In turn, Johnston ordered Pemberton to move east and take the offensive. On May 16, Confederate Brigadier General Stephen D. Lee encountered elements of Grant's army during the move east, beginning the Battle of Champion Hill. During the battle, Landis's Battery provided artillery support for the Confederate center. By this time, Lieutenant John M. Langan had replaced Landis as battery commander, after the latter became divisional artillery commander within Bowen's Division. The infantrymen of Bowen's Division made a strong attack against the Union line, and some of the Confederate artillery, including Landis's Battery, moved forward to support the charge. As Bowen's men were deploying, Landis's and Wade's Batteries fired on Union skirmishers, temporarily dispersing them. The 17th Ohio Battery then arrived on the field, and began firing on the Confederate batteries. Landis's and Wade's guns lacked the range to effectively return fire, and the Ohioans had the better of the exchange, as Landis's two howitzers were disabled. When Bowen's attack was forced back, Landis's Battery moved forward to provide covering fire, expending all its ammunition. At one point, Landis ordered the men to fire a shell in the path of a retreating Confederate regiment in an attempt to force the men to rally. At Champion Hill, Landis's Battery suffered either five or nine casualties. Four of the losses were inflicted by a single shell fired by the 17th Ohio Battery. Pemberton's entire army retreated from the field later that day. A Confederate division commanded by Major General William W. Loring had become separated from the rest of the Confederate force during the retreat, leading Pemberton to order Bowen's division and a brigade commanded by Brigadier General John C. Vaughn to hold the crossing of the Big Black River in hopes that Loring could rejoin the main Confederate force.

The next day, the battery was present at the Battle of Big Black River Bridge. The unit's exact placement during the fight is variously reported. The historian Philip Thomas Tucker reports that a portion of the battery was assigned to the Confederate front line, and the rest on the far side of the river. Tucker then states that when the Confederate line was broken by a Union assault, that front line portion of the battery lost its cannons, as the battery's horses had been sent to the other side of the Big Black River. Other sources say the battery was positioned entirely on the far side of the river. The historian James McGhee says the two pieces damaged at Champion Hill were not present at this action. Either way, the portion of the battery across the river helped cover the Confederate retreat, and entered the fortifications of Vicksburg. During the siege of Vicksburg, some of the artillerymen served as sharpshooters due to a shortage of cannons. On May 22, the battery helped repulse Union attacks, at one point using double-shotted ammunition. Over the course of the siege, the unit suffered either ten or thirteen casualties during a 47-day span of mostly continuous fighting. The Confederates surrendered Vicksburg on July 4, and Landis's Battery was captured at this time. The 37 men left in the battery were released on parole until they were exchanged; they were also ordered to Demopolis, Alabama. On October 1, Landis's Battery and Wade's Missouri Battery were absorbed by Guibor's Battery; Landis's Battery ceased to exist as a separate unit. About 75 men served with the battery throughout the war. The unit reported the deaths of 22 of its members. Of these, fifteen were the result of battle, while six died from disease and one member of the battery was murdered.

See also

 List of Missouri Confederate Civil War units

Notes

References

Sources

External links
 

Units and formations of the Confederate States Army from Missouri
1862 establishments in Missouri
Artillery units and formations of the American Civil War
1863 disestablishments in Alabama
Military units and formations disestablished in 1863
Military units and formations established in 1862